The canton of Château-Porcien is an administrative division of the Ardennes department, northern France. Its borders were modified at the French canton reorganisation which came into effect in March 2015. Its seat is in Château-Porcien.

It consists of the following communes:

Aire
Alincourt
Annelles
Asfeld
Aussonce
Avançon
Avaux
Balham
Banogne-Recouvrance
Bergnicourt
Bignicourt
Blanzy-la-Salonnaise
Brienne-sur-Aisne
Château-Porcien
Le Châtelet-sur-Retourne
Condé-lès-Herpy
L'Écaille
Écly
Gomont
Hannogne-Saint-Rémy
Hauteville
Herpy-l'Arlésienne
Houdilcourt
Inaumont
Juniville
Ménil-Annelles
Ménil-Lépinois
Neuflize
La Neuville-en-Tourne-à-Fuy
Perthes
Poilcourt-Sydney
Roizy
Saint-Fergeux
Saint-Germainmont
Saint-Loup-en-Champagne
Saint-Quentin-le-Petit
Saint-Remy-le-Petit
Sault-Saint-Remy
Seraincourt
Sévigny-Waleppe
Son
Tagnon
Taizy
Le Thour
Vieux-lès-Asfeld
Villers-devant-le-Thour
Ville-sur-Retourne

References

Cantons of Ardennes (department)